The Albert lates (Lates macrophthalmus) is a species of lates perch endemic to Lake Albert in Africa.  This species is found in open waters at depths of from 20 m (66 ft) to 40 m (131 ft).  It can reach a length of 29 cm (11 in) TL.  It is commercially important and is also popular as a game fish.

References

Lates
Taxa named by E. Barton Worthington
Taxonomy articles created by Polbot